The discography of American rapper Mystikal consists of five studio albums, one independent album, two compilation albums, twenty-five singles and fifteen music videos. In 1994, Mystikal released a self-titled album on the independent record label Big Boy. Following his signing to Jive Records in 1995, the album was re-released under the title Mind of Mystikal as his debut studio album. Mind of Mystikal peaked at number 103 on the US Billboard 200 and at number 13 on the US Top R&B/Hip-Hop Albums chart. The album featured the single "Y'all Ain't Ready Yet", which peaked at number 41 on the US Hot R&B/Hip-Hop Songs chart. Mystikal's following two studio albums, Unpredictable and Ghetto Fabulous, were both released on the record label No Limit Records; Jive distributed the albums rather than No Limit's distributor, Priority Records. Both peaked in the top five of the Billboard 200 and were later certified platinum by the Recording Industry Association of America (RIAA). Each of the albums featured one single, "Ain't No Limit" and "That's the Nigga", respectively. Both songs peaked in the top 65 of the Hot R&B/Hip-Hop Songs chart.

Following his departure from No Limit, Mystikal released his fourth album, Let's Get Ready, on September 26, 2000. The album became his most commercially successful release in the United States, peaking at number one on the Billboard 200, also charting in the Canada, Germany and the United Kingdom. It was later certified double platinum by the RIAA. Let's Get Ready spawned two singles, "Shake Ya Ass" and "Danger (Been So Long)" with singer Nivea, which both charted within the top 15 in the United States and also achieved success in several other countries. In 2001, Mystikal collaborated with singer Joe on the single "Stutter", which became Mystikal's first and only song to top the Billboard Hot 100, and also appeared on several national singles charts worldwide. Mystikal's fifth album, Tarantula, featured the singles "Bouncin' Back (Bumpin' Me Against the Wall)" and "Tarantula" – the latter a collaboration with rapper Butch Cassidy. "Bouncin' Back (Bumpin' Me Against the Wall)" became Mystikal's third and final song to appear on the Billboard Hot 100. It peaked at number 37 and also charted in the United Kingdom.

While Mystikal served a prison term in 2004 for sexual battery, Jive released two compilations of Mystikal's music, Prince of the South... The Hits and Chopped & Screwed, although neither appeared in the top 100 on the Billboard 200. Following his release from prison in 2010, Mystikal's upcoming sixth studio album, Original, is to be released on Cash Money Records, and has so far been preceded by the single "Original", released in 2011, which features fellow rappers Birdman and Lil Wayne; the song peaked at number 80 on the Hot R&B/Hip-Hop Songs chart.

Albums

Studio albums

Independent albums

Compilation albums

Singles

As lead artist

As featured artist

Promotional singles

Other charted songs

Guest appearances

Music videos

As featured performer

See also 
 504 Boyz discography
 No Limit Records discography

Notes 

A  "Y'all Ain't Ready Yet" did not enter the Billboard Hot 100, but peaked at number 6 on the Bubbling Under Hot 100 Singles chart, which acts as an extension to the Hot 100.
B  "How We Comin did not enter the Billboard Hot 100, but peaked at number 22 on the Bubbling Under Hot 100 Singles chart, which acts as an extension to the Hot 100.
C  "Don't Stop (Funkin' 4 Jamaica)" did not enter the Billboard Hot 100, but peaked at number 23 on the Bubbling Under Hot 100 Singles chart, which acts as an extension to the Hot 100.
D  "Wizzy Wow" did not enter the Hot R&B/Hip-Hop Songs chart, but peaked at number 8 on the Bubbling Under R&B/Hip-Hop Singles chart, which acts as an extension to the Hot R&B/Hip-Hop Songs chart.
E  "Fly Rich" did not enter the Hot R&B/Hip-Hop Songs chart, but peaked at number 10 on the Bubbling Under R&B/Hip-Hop Singles chart, which acts as an extension to the Hot R&B/Hip-Hop Songs chart.
F  "If It Ain't Live, It Ain't Me" did not enter the Hot R&B/Hip-Hop Songs chart, but peaked at number 4 on the Bubbling Under R&B/Hip-Hop Singles chart, which acts as an extension to the Hot R&B/Hip-Hop Songs chart.

References 

Hip hop discographies
Discographies of American artists